"What We Really Want" is a song written and recorded by American country music artist Rosanne Cash.  It was released in September 1990 as the first single from the album Interiors.  The song reached #39 on the Billboard Hot Country Singles & Tracks chart.

Chart performance

References

1990 singles
1990 songs
Rosanne Cash songs
Songs written by Rosanne Cash
Columbia Records singles